Kanglei Yawol Kanna Lup (or Kanglei Yaol Kanba Lup) is a Meitei separatist group in the state of Manipur in India formed in January 1994  by the unification of splinter groups like Ibopishak faction of the Kangleipak Communist Party (KCP) along with  United National Liberation Front (UNLF) led by Namoijam Oken and the People's Revolutionary Party of Kangleipak (PREPAK) led by Meiraba. It was banned by the Government of India.

References 

1994 establishments in Manipur
Insurgency in Northeast India
Left-wing militant groups in India
Manipur politicians
Organisations designated as terrorist by India
Organizations based in Asia designated as terrorist
Political parties established in 1994